Teja Černe (born September 29, 1984) is a Slovenian competitive sailor. She was born in Koper. She competed at the 2004 Summer Olympics in Athens in the women's one person dinghy event, the Europe class. She competed at the 2012 Summer Olympics in London, in the women's 470, together with Tina Mrak.

References

1984 births
Living people
Slovenian female sailors (sport)
Olympic sailors of Slovenia
Sailors at the 2004 Summer Olympics – Europe
Sailors at the 2012 Summer Olympics – 470
Sportspeople from Koper
Mediterranean Games bronze medalists for Slovenia
Competitors at the 2005 Mediterranean Games
Mediterranean Games medalists in sailing
21st-century Slovenian women